Godel is a river of the North Frisian island Föhr, Schleswig-Holstein, Germany.

The Godel springs at Witsum and Utersum from several tidal creeks. It discharges southeast of Witsum into the North Sea.

Gallery

See also
List of rivers of Schleswig-Holstein

References

Rivers of Schleswig-Holstein
Rivers of Germany